The Women's 400 m Individual Medley event at the 2006 Central American and Caribbean Games occurred on Monday, July 17, 2006, at the S.U. Pedro de Heredia Aquatic Complex in Cartagena, Colombia.

Records at the time of the event were:
World Record: 4:33.59, Yana Klochkova (Ukraine), Sydney, Australia, September 16, 2000.
Games Record: 4:52.42, Carolyn Adel (Suriname), 1998 Games in Maracaibo (August.9.1998).

Results

Final

Preliminaries

References

Results: 2006 CACs--Swimming: Women's 400 IM--prelims from the official website of the 2006 Central American and Caribbean Games; retrieved 2009-07-11.
Results: 2006 CACs--Swimming: Women's 400 IM--finals from the official website of the 2006 Central American and Caribbean Games; retrieved 2009-07-11.

Medley, Women's 400m
2006 in women's swimming